The 1942 New South Wales Rugby Football League premiership was the thirty-fifth season of Sydney's top-level rugby league football competition, Australia's first. Eight teams from across the city contested the premiership during the season, which lasted from May until September, culminating in the Canterbury-Bankstown club's grand final victory over St. George.

Teams
 Balmain, formed on 23 January 1908 at Balmain Town Hall
 Canterbury-Bankstown
 Eastern Suburbs, formed on 24 January 1908 at Paddington Town Hall
 Newtown, formed on 14 January 1908
 North Sydney, formed on 7 February 1908
 South Sydney, formed on 17 January 1908 at Redfern Town Hall
 St. George, formed on 8 November 1920 at Kogarah School of Arts
 Western Suburbs, formed on 4 February 1908

Ladder

Finals
The minor premiership was won by Canterbury-Bankstown in a play off against Balmain after both sides had finished the season on twenty points.

In the semi finals, Canterbury-Bankstown lost their match to St. George whilst Eastern Suburbs, who only just made the finals after South Sydney had drawn their match in the final round of the season, defeated Balmain. The result of the first semi final meant that St. George and Eastern Suburbs played a preliminary final which would decide who met minor premiers Canterbury-Bankstown in the Grand Final. St. George won the match, as they had done four weeks earlier over Easts in the final round of the season proper.

St. George had won two matches in the semis while Canterbury had just one victory, but the Berries were guaranteed a Grand Final berth under a call back of the old rules giving the minor premiers a right of challenge. In the Grand Final, Canterbury-Bankstown narrowly defeated St. George to collect their second premiership victory.

Grand Final

The Sydney Cricket Ground was a muddy quagmire with a treacherous patch in the centre which kept the teams evenly matched and the crowd in a fever of excitement until the final whistle. The "Gregory’s" reference records that 7,000 of the crowd on the hill had jumped the fence during the reserve grade final and invaded the half-empty new member's stand. Towards the end of the first grade match 5,000 people crowded onto the touchline and referee O'Brien had to hold up play until officials were able to get them back twenty yards.

Canterbury's defence was tested during a torrid ten-minute period when St. George hurled themselves at the line from never more than eight yards away. The Berries defence held and the Dragons could not break through.

The Canterbury-Bankstown tactics were to keep the game with the forwards and away from the St George backs. Canterbury hooker Kirkaldy won the vital scrums. Bob Farrar, Frank Sponberg and Henry Porter were tireless with Porter's handling and kicking skills on display.

Saints were leading 9–6 late in the match after a try to their record-breaking winger Jack Lindwall was converted by his brother Ray Lindwall. Berries' winger Bob Jackson then scored a magnificent try made possible by a resolute and tricky run from skipper Ron Bailey which locked up the scores at 9–all.

Canterbury's Lindsay Johnson managed a late conversion to secure the win. Johnson's goal just scraped over the cross bar to give his team the premiership.

Canterbury-Bankstown 11 (Tries: Jackson. Goals: Johnson 4)

defeated

St George 9 (Tries: J. Lindwall. Goals: R. Lindwall 3)

Player statistics
The following statistics are as of the conclusion of Round 14.

Top 5 point scorers

Top 5 try scorers

Top 5 goal scorers

References

External links
 Rugby League Tables - Notes AFL Tables
 Rugby League Tables - Season 1942 AFL Tables
 Premiership History and Statistics RL1908
 Results: 1941–50 at rabbitohs.com.au

New South Wales Rugby League premiership
NSWRFL season